Jack Hurley (December 9, 1897-November 16, 1972) was an American boxing promoter.  Working in boxing for over 50 years, he was well known and appreciated both in the sport and by journalists, although he never managed a champion.(18 November 1972). Jack Hurley Dies; Boxing Manager, The New York Times(14 June 1954). Sport: The Talker, TIME

Hurley grew up in Fargo, North Dakota.  After serving in France during World War I, he tried boxing, but found he was better suited for managing and promoting fighters.  Starting in 1922 he had success managing lightweight Billy Petrolle.  After Petrolle retired, he became a promoter in Chicago.  By the late 1940s he was back to managing, including Harry "Kid" Matthews.(14 June 1954). Sport: The Talker, TIME  Hurley later moved on to Seattle, where he spent the last 20 years of his career.   He managed Boone Kirkman among other fighters in Seattle.  In 1957 he promoted the title world heavyweight title fight between Pete Rademacher, in his first professional match, against Floyd Patterson.  It being the first ever fight between an amateur and a world champion drew attention and controversy.Smith, Craig (5 February 1994). Patterson Recalls 1957 Frightful Fight In Seattle -- Ex-Champ Admits Taking Rademacher Too Lightly, Seattle Times

Hurley was known for being honest in a sport where "a certain amount of dishonesty is not only expected but also demanded."  In Seatle he was called ""the conscience of Seattle."  Writer Damon Runyon said Jack Hurley was one of only two honest prize-fighter managers he had known, "and I forget the name of the other."

Boxing historian John Ochs published a three-volume biography of Hurley in 2017.

References

1897 births
1972 deaths
American boxing promoters
Boxing promoters
People from Fargo, North Dakota